Hulley is a surname. Notable people with the surname include:

Angie Hulley (born 1962), British long-distance runner
Annie Hulley (born 1955), English television and stage actress 
John Hulley (1832–1875), English gymnastics and athletics entrepreneur
P. Alexander Hulley (born 1941), South African zoologist and ichthyologist
Abigail Hulley (born 2004),

See also
Hulleys of Baslow trading name of Henry Hulley and Sons Ltd, a bus company based in Derbyshire, England